Aleksandar Dubljević (Cyrillic: Александар Дубљeвић; born 9 March 1985) is a Montenegrin retired football defender.

Club career
Born in Nikšić, he made his senior debut with FK Sutjeska Nikšić in the First League of Serbia and Montenegro in 2003.  He had a short spell with another local club, FK Čelik Nikšić, playing in the Second League group South, before rejoining Sutjeska where he would stay the following six seasons.

In summer 2010 he moved to FK Inđija, a newly promoted side in the Serbian SuperLiga, but in the following winter he was back with Sutjeska.  In 2011 after a short spell with his former club FK Čelik Nikšić in the Montenegrin Second League, he joined Azerbaijani side Turan Tovuz PFC in the Azerbaijan Premier League.  In summer 2012 he was back with now promoted FK Čelik Nikšić having come in time to play in the 2011–12 Montenegrin Cup final in which Čelik has won Rudar by 2–1 with Dubljević scoring the first goal of his team.

Honours
Čelik Nikšić
Montenegrin Second League: 2011–12
Montenegrin Cup: 2012

References

External links
 Aleksandar Dubljević at FSCG.co.me

1985 births
Living people
Footballers from Nikšić
Association football defenders
Serbia and Montenegro footballers
Montenegrin footballers
FK Sutjeska Nikšić players
FK Čelik Nikšić players
FK Inđija players
Turan-Tovuz IK players
FK Mornar players
FK Rudar Pljevlja players
Montenegrin First League players
Azerbaijan Premier League players
Serbian SuperLiga players
Montenegrin expatriate footballers
Expatriate footballers in Serbia
Montenegrin expatriate sportspeople in Serbia
Expatriate footballers in Azerbaijan
Montenegrin expatriate sportspeople in Azerbaijan